Afyonkarahisarspor was a sports club located in Afyonkarahisar, Turkey. The football club played in the Regional Amateur League.

References

External links
Afyonkarahisarspor  Website

 
Sport in Afyonkarahisar
Afyonkarahisarspor
Association football clubs established in 2005
2005 establishments in Turkey